Rife House is a historic home located at Shawsville, Montgomery County, Virginia.  It was built in 1905, and is a two-story, rectangular Queen Anne style frame dwelling with a flat-topped hipped roof with cast iron ornamental cresting.  It features a one-story, curved, wraparound porch with Doric order columns on pedestals and equipped with a turned balustrade.  Also on the property is a contributing frame outbuilding.

It was listed on the National Register of Historic Places in 1989.

References

Houses on the National Register of Historic Places in Virginia
Queen Anne architecture in Virginia
Houses completed in 1905
Houses in Montgomery County, Virginia
National Register of Historic Places in Montgomery County, Virginia
1905 establishments in Virginia